Foundation for Subsidiarity (Fondazione per la Sussidiarietà) is an Italian think tank founded in Milan, Italy, in 2002 with the goal to enrich cultural-scientific discourse and promote a vision of society based on the centrality of the person and the principle of subsidiarity. Through its projects, the Foundation has created a network of multidisciplinary collaborations both nationally and internationally.

External links 
  
 Atlantide
 Il Sussidiario
 Il Sussidiario (English)

Think tanks established in 2002
Think tanks based in Italy
Catholic social teaching
Organisations based in Milan
2002 establishments in Italy